Potamilus capax, the fat pocketbook pearly mussel or fat pocketbook, is a species of freshwater mussel, an aquatic bivalve mollusk in the family Unionidae, the river mussels.

The fat pocketbook is a large freshwater mussel which requires flowing water and a stable base on which the organism can live.  However there is still inconsistent research when deciding which habitat the fat pocketbook prefers, but most likely it is a mixture of sand, silt and clay.  There is nothing particularly unique about this freshwater mussel it acts very similar to other native freshwater mussels. The freshwater drum was tested in comparison to the fat pocketbooks reproductive cycle and it has proven not to differ from other freshwater mussels. They can now be found or come across in a small, undredged portion of the St. Francis River in St. Francis County, Arkansas.  Greater risks that caused the population of the fat pocketbook to decrease in the past are navigation and flood control. The species seems to have cleared out of the Mississippi River where they used to be spotted, due to the river being impounded for navigation and is dredged routinely to uphold a nine- foot navigation channel. A similar situation took place in the St. Francis Floodway. Also in the White River in Arkansas the shifting sand bars no longer supply a stable substrate for the mussels.  Their population is believed to be declining more currently due to canal repair activities, alterations in temperature, water flow, and impoundments remain a huge threat to the very existence of this species.

References

 Fish and Wildlife Service 
 EPA: Pesticides Endangered Species Protection Program 

Molluscs of the United States
capax
ESA endangered species
Taxonomy articles created by Polbot